The Philosophy Research Index is an indexing database containing bibliographic information on philosophical publications in several western languages. It contains listings for a range of philosophical publications, including books, anthologies, scholarly journals, dissertations, and other documents. The first version of the database was launched by the Philosophy Documentation Center in 2011 after a multi-year planning and development process, with technical support from Makrolog Content Management. It was established to build systematic coverage of philosophical literature in several languages in a manner that could be sustained for the long term. The database provides faceted searching, automatic translation and social networking functionality, and a visual time line for the display of search results, as well as OpenURL linking to fulltext resources. Philosophical topics covered include aesthetics, epistemology, ethics, history of philosophy, logic, metaphysics, philosophy of language, philosophy of religion, philosophy of science, political philosophy, and social philosophy.

In July 2014 PDC partnered with the PhilPapers Foundation. All data in the Philosophy Research Index will be consolidated into the PhilPapers database. The Philosophy Research Index will no longer be available as a separate resource once commitments to its current customers have been fulfilled.

See also
 List of academic databases and search engines

Notes

External links 
 Philosophy Research Index
 Philosophy Documentation Center
 PhilPapers

Bibliographic databases and indexes
Publications established in 2010
Philosophy Documentation Center academic journals
Philosophical databases